Henricia ornata, the reticulated starfish, is a species of starfish in the family Echinasteridae. It is native to the southeastern Atlantic Ocean on the coast of South Africa, the type locality being the Cape of Good Hope.

References

Echinasteridae
Starfish described in 1869